The Turkish Basketball Cup Final MVP is an award that is given to the most outstanding player in the Final of the Turkish Basketball Cup. The award is handed out since the 2010–11 season.

Winners

Awards won by nationality

Awards won by club

References

Basketball most valuable player awards
MvP